is a motorway in southern Germany, leading from the Austrian border (A14) near Lindau (Lake Constance) through Memmingen, Landsberg am Lech to Munich. Two European routes lead through the autobahn: E 43 and E 54.

It was first planned to build a direct connection between Munich and Lindau before World War II, south of Ammersee. During the 1972 Summer Olympics in Munich, a section from Munich to Oberpfaffenhofen and Germering was built. A  part of the road during those games were used for the road team time trial cycling event.

The last two-laned section, from Wangen-Nord to Leutkirch-Süd, was upgraded in 2009.

Exit list 

| Austria
|-
|colspan="3"|

 

 
|}

External links

References 

Venues of the 1972 Summer Olympics
96
A096
A096
Olympic cycling venues